Matthias Duan Yinming (22 February 1908 - 10 January 2001) was a Chinese Roman Catholic Bishop of Roman Catholic Diocese of Sichuan, China.

Biography
Duan was born in Dachuan District, Dazhou, Sichuan, on February 22, 1908, to a Catholic family, during the late Qing dynasty. He went to study at Pontifical Urban University in Rome in 1935. He was ordained a priest in 1938.

In 1944, he was appointed president of the Shiguang Catholic Church. On June 9, 1949, Pope Pius XII appointed Duan as bishop of the Roman Catholic Diocese of Wanxian. He was ordained bishop on October 18 of that same year.

After the establishment of the Communist State, he successively served as director of the Sichuan Catholic Partnership, member of the China Catholic Partnership, vice-chairman of Sichuan Catholic Partnership. 

In 1998, Pope John Paul II invited Duan to attend the special session of bishops in Asia. He could not travel without a passport.

He died on January 10, 2001.

References

1908 births
2001 deaths
Sichuanese Roman Catholics
Pontifical Urban University alumni
People from Dazhou
20th-century Roman Catholic bishops in China